The Big Blue Hills are a low mountain range in west Fresno County, in the western San Joaquin Valley of central California.

Interstate 5 runs parallel to the hills on the east.

Geography
The Big Blue Hills are in the Southern Inner California Coast Ranges System, adjacent to the Diablo Range on the west.

Cantua Creek and its Arroyo de Cantúa canyon divides them from the Ciervo Hills.

References 

Mountain ranges of Fresno County, California
California Coast Ranges
Diablo Range
Geography of the San Joaquin Valley
Mountain ranges of Northern California